Francis Mark Bethwaite AM (born 20 March 1948) is an Australian sailor. He was educated at North Sydney Boys High School He competed for Australia at two Olympic Games, 1972 and 1976, in the Flying Dutchman class.

He is the son of pilot, yachtsman, yacht designer and meteorologist Frank Bethwaite and the brother of fellow dual Olympian Nicky Bethwaite.

A civil engineer, he has served on the boards of many Australian companies.

References

External links
 Profile at the Australian Olympic Committee

Living people
1948 births
People educated at North Sydney Boys High School
Australian business executives
Australian Champions Soling
Australian male sailors (sport)
Members of the Order of Australia
Olympic sailors of Australia
Sailors at the 1972 Summer Olympics – Flying Dutchman
Sailors at the 1976 Summer Olympics – Flying Dutchman
Soling class world champions
20th-century Australian people